Tapinoma baculum is an extinct species of ant in the genus Tapinoma. Described by Zhang in 1989, fossils of the species were found in China.

References

†
Hymenoptera of Europe
Fossil ant taxa
Fossil taxa described in 1989